Mateusz Zembrzycki (born 18 March 1997) is a Polish handball player for KS Azoty-Puławy and the Polish national team.

References

1997 births
Living people
Sportspeople from Opole
Polish male handball players